Michael Meredith (born 1971) is an American architect, principal and co-founder of award-winning architecture firm MOS Architects in New York City.

Education
Meredith received a Master of Architecture with distinction from the Harvard Graduate School of Design (2000) and a Bachelor in Architecture from Syracuse University (1994).

Professional life
With partner Hilary Sample, they founded MOS Architects in 2003. Meredith and Sample teach at Princeton University School of Architecture and Columbia University, respectively, and their academic research occurs in parallel to the real-world constraints and contingencies of practice, informing both. Recent projects include four studio buildings for the Krabbesholm Højskole campus, the Museum of Outdoor Arts Element House visitor center, the Floating House on Lake Huron, and the Lali Gurans Orphanage and Learning Center in Kathmandu, Nepal. In 2015 MOS Architects also designed the exhibition The Other Architect at the Canadian Centre for Architecture.

Awards
MOS has been honored with numerous awards, including: The Cooper Hewitt, Smithsonian Design Museum’s National Design Award in Architecture in 2015, a 2014 Holcim Award, an Academy Award for Architecture from the American Academy of Arts and Letters, the Architectural League’s 2008 Emerging Voices Award, a National Endowment for the Arts Our Town grant and the P/A Award from Architect magazine.

Academic life
Meredith is a professor at Princeton University. In 2015, Meredith and Sample served as the Fitzhugh Scott MasterCrit Chairs in Design Excellence at UW Milwaukee School of Architecture and Urban Planning. He has previously taught architecture at several schools, including the Harvard University Graduate School of Design, the University of Michigan, where he was awarded the Muschenheim Fellowship, and the University of Toronto.

Publications 

 2012 Everything All at Once: The Software, Architecture, and Videos of MOS, Michael Meredith and Hilary Sample, Princeton Architectural Press
 2012 Matter: Material Processes in Architectural Production, edited by Gail Peter Borden and Michael Meredith, Routledge
 2015 MOS: Selected Works, Michael Meredith and Hilary Sample, Princeton Architectural Press
 2018 An Unfinished ... Encyclopedia of ... Scale Figures Without ... Architecture, edited by Michael Meredith, Hilary Sample & MOS, The MIT Press
 2019 A Constant Search for Architecture: Michael Meredith and Hilary Sample on a Curious Journey, essay by Michael Meredith and Hilary Sample, Canadian Centre for Architecture
 2019 Houses for Sale, Michael Meredith and Hilary Sample, Canadian Centre for Architecture and Corraini Edizioni

References

External links
 MOS Architects website
Find and Tell: Michael Meredith on John Hejduk, recording available from Canadian Centre for Architecture

1971 births
Living people
Architects from New York City
Harvard Graduate School of Design alumni
Syracuse University alumni
Princeton University faculty